emir can tombul (born 5 January 2001) is a Turkish 'footballer' who 'plays' as a 'defender'.

Career

Early career
Tombul played with the academy sides of Rapperswil-Jona, Grasshoppers, Lommel and a loan spell with Vitória Guimarães, where he made 6 appearances for Guimarães B in the Liga Revelacao U-23.

New York Red Bulls II
On 27 April 2021, Tombul signed with USL Championship side New York Red Bulls II. He made his debut on 30 April 2021, starting in a 3–2 loss to Hartford Athletic. Following the 2021 season, Tombul's contract option was declined by New York.

References

2001 births
Living people
Association football defenders
Turkish footballers
New York Red Bulls II players
FC Wil players
USL Championship players
Swiss Challenge League players
2. Liga Interregional players
Turkish expatriate footballers
Turkish expatriate sportspeople in Belgium
Expatriate footballers in Belgium
Turkish expatriate sportspeople in Portugal
Expatriate footballers in Portugal
Turkish expatriate sportspeople in the United States
Expatriate soccer players in the United States
Turkish expatriate sportspeople in Switzerland
Expatriate footballers in Switzerland